Born from an exchange of ideas between Michel Costantini and Göran Sonesson during the congress of the International Association for Semiotic Studies held in Perpignan, in the south of France, in 1988, the International Association for Visual Semiotics (Asociación Internacional de Semiótica Visual, in Spanish, Association internationale de sémiotique visuelle, in French, the three official languages of the association), whose abbreviation is AISV-IAVS, was officially founded as an association under the French law in 1989 in Blois, France, where the first international congress was held in 1990.

The congress had in that opportunity more than one hundred of visual semioticians coming from all over the world. At that time, the association was called International Association of Semiology of the Image, or AISIM (according to its acronym in French), and its name was changed in 1992.

As its name indicates (visual semiotics), the main objective of the IAVS is to gather semioticians all over the world who are interested in images and, in more general terms, in visual signification, without privileging any particular interpretation of semiotics, and without favoring any semiotic tradition in particular.

The congresses
After the foundational congress in Blois, the second congress of the IAVS was held in Bilbao, Spain, in 1992, while the third congress was integrated with the international congress of the AIS-IASS (International Association for Semiotic Studies) held at the University of California, Berkeley, USA, in 1994. The next congresses were organized in Sao Paulo, Brazil (1996), Siena, Italy (1998), Quebec City, Canada (2001). The 7th congress was organized in Mexico City in 2003 and was continued with the sessions of 2004 in Lyon, during the 8th Congress of the International Association for Semiotic Studies. The 8th congress was held in Istanbul in 2007, the 9th one was in Venice in 2010, the 10th one was in Buenos Aires in 2012, and the 11th one was in Liège in 2015.

The IAVS has also organized meetings or sessions together with the International Association of the Semiotics of Space, mainly during the IASS congress held in Dresden, Germany, in October 1999. Other joint sessions were held during the IAVS congress in Quebec City. The IAVS has also organized sessions on visual semiotics during the congress of the IASS in A Coruña (2009), and regional European conferences in Lisbon, in 2011, and Urbino, in 2014.

Chronology of congresses

Other meetings or sessions

Executive committee

The first president of the IAVS was Michel Costantini in 1989. The first elected president was Fernande Saint-Martin, from the Université du Québec à Montréal. The second president, elected during the congress in Berkeley, California, in 1994, was Jacques Fontanille, from the University of Limoges. Ana Claudia de Oliveira, from the Pontifícia Universidade Católica de São Paulo, was elected president during the congress held in Sao Paulo in 1996, and Paolo Fabbri, from the University of Bologna, was elected president in Siena in 1998. Jean-Marie Klinkenberg, from the University of Liège, and member of the Groupe µ, was elected president during the congress in Quebec City in 2001, and has been re-elected at the general assemblies held in Lyon 2004, Istanbul 2007 and Venice 2010. José Luis Caivano, from the University of Buenos Aires, was elected president in the conference of 2012. The current president, since the conference 2015, is Göran Sonesson, from the University of Lund, Sweden.

Chronology of members of the executive committee

Publications

In its beginnings, the IAVS used the journal EIDOS, Bulletin international de sémiologie de l’image, created previously by the research group with the same name in Blois (François Rabelais University, Tours), as the organ of research. However, after 1996, the IAVS started to publish its official journal, VISIO, Revue internationale de sémiotique visuelle, with the financial and logistic support of the CRSHC and the CÉLAT, at the Faculty of Literature, Université Laval, in Quebec City.

VISIO has published 4 thematic issues per year, from 1996 until 2002, under the direction of invited editors, and has accepted articles written in the three official languages: French, English and Spanish. Fernande Saint-Martin, from the Université du Québec à Montréal, has been the general director, and Marie Carani, from the Université Laval, has been the editor-in-chief. The honorary committee was composed by Hubert Damisch, Umberto Eco and Boris Uspensky. In the editorial committee have served José Luis Caivano, from the University of Buenos Aires, Michel Costantini, from the Paris 8 University, Jacques Fontanille, from the University of Limoges, Donald Preziosi, from the University of California, Los Angeles, and Göran Sonesson, from the University of Lund in Sweden. The members of the editorial committee are assisted by an international scientific committee composed by more than 70 specialists in general semiotics and visual semiotics, distributed all over the world.

External links
 AISV-IAVS website: http://aisviavs.wordpress.com/

International learned societies
Semiotics organizations